Christine Louise Leadman was a city councillor in Ottawa, Canada. She won the position for Kitchissippi Ward councillor in the 2006 Ottawa municipal election on 13 November 2006 after incumbent Shawn Little dropped out of the race. She only served one term however, losing the 2010 election. to Katherine Hobbs.  After her defeat she went to on to head the Glebe Business Improvement Area (BIA).

Before being elected to city council she was executive director of the Westboro Business Improvement Area for 14 years. She worked on the board of the community paper Newswest for a decade prior to its merger with Kitchissippi Times. She is also an active volunteer for the development and support of arts in the region.

She was opposed to the original O-Train North-South light rail project proposal that would have run from downtown to Barrhaven starting in 2009.

References

External links

 Obituary for Fawzia Amir Rahman, mother of Christine Leadman.

1950s births
Living people
Businesspeople from Ottawa
Ottawa city councillors
Women municipal councillors in Canada
Women in Ontario politics
American emigrants to Canada
Canadian people of Egyptian descent